Communist Refoundation may refer to:
Communist Refoundation Party, a political party in Italy
Sammarinese Communist Refoundation, a former political party in San Marino